Ashton Observatory  is a public astronomical observatory operated by the Des Moines Astronomical Society, in collaboration with Jasper County, Iowa (USA). It is located in Ashton-Wildwood County Park near Baxter, Iowa.  Public programs are presented on Saturday evenings in the months of April through October, except for the first Saturday of each month.   These public nights were cancelled for 2020, due to the Covid-19 pandemic.

The Building 
Built in 1983,  the observatory originally consisted of two domes connected by a small room.   Each dome houses a 16 inch aperture telescope, and can accommodate about one dozen people.  In 2002 a 30 by 30 foot classroom was added to the building's north side, allowing for public presentations to groups of up to 50 visitors.
The classroom was badly damaged by the August 2020 Midwest derecho, and is being extensively renovated.

South of the building there are several concrete pads upon which portable telescopes can be deployed to accommodate star parties.

The Mural 

A colorful mural covers the exterior north side of the building.   The 270 square foot mural, commissioned by the Jasper County Conservation Department, depicts the southern night sky as seen from the observatory including the planet positions at the time of the mural's creation (summer 2019) over a prairie scene.   The stars and planets were painted with phosphorescent paint, making them visible in the dark after sunset. The mural was created by local artists Lauren Roush and Pauli Zmolek from Newton.   Ms Roush, an art teacher, recruited around 40 young students to help in the early stages of painting on site. It was dedicated on September 7, 2019.

Public Nights 
Public programs are presented every Saturday night during the months of April through October, except for the first Saturday of each month.   The programs begin with a lecture on an astronomy-related topic at 8:00 PM CDT.   Following the lecture and weather permitting, visitors are shown objects such as the Moon, planets and bright nebulae through the telescopes in the observatory domes, and a few smaller telescopes deployed outside of the observatory.   The lecture topics are available posted online early each year.

Private Visits 
For a small fee, groups may schedule private visits on any night except Saturday night.   Groups as large as 50 people can be accommodated.  Volunteer telescope operators will support viewing astronomical objects through the observatory's telescopes.

See also 
List of observatories

References

External links
 Ashton Observatory Clear Sky Clock Forecasts of observing conditions.

Astronomical observatories in Iowa
Buildings and structures in Jasper County, Iowa
Tourist attractions in Jasper County, Iowa
Education in Jasper County, Iowa